Lars Musæus (9 August 1908 – 7 June 1975) was a Norwegian sailor. He was born in Ålesund. He competed at the 1948 Summer Olympics in London, where he placed fourth in the 6 metre class, together with Magnus Konow, Ragnar Hargreaves, Anders Evensen and Håkon Solem.

References

External links

1908 births
1975 deaths
Sportspeople from Ålesund
Norwegian male sailors (sport)
Olympic sailors of Norway
Sailors at the 1948 Summer Olympics – 6 Metre